Happoradio (Finnish for Acid Radio) is a Finnish rock band formed in 2001. They achieved their first success with the single "Pois Kalliosta" (2003). "Tavikset", "Che Guevara", "Ahmat tulevat" and "Pelastaja" are some of their other hits in the Scandinavian market.

Members 
 Aki Tykki (voice, guitar)
 Mika "AH" Haapasalo (guitar)
 Jatu Motti (bass)
 Markku DeFrost (drums)
 Klaus Suominen (Keyboard)

Discography

Studio albums

Compilation albums

Singles

Videos 
 Sinä (2003) Director: Tero Rajala
 Pois Kalliosta (2003) Director: Tuukka Temonen
 Linnusta sammakoksi (2005) Director: Aleksi Koskinen
 Tavikset (2006) Director: Kusti Manninen
 Suru on (2006) Director: Mikko Kallio
 Hirsipuu (2008) Director: Kusti Manninen
 Che Guevara (2008) Director: Kusti Manninen, Jaakko Manninen
 Puhu äänellä jonka kuulen (2008) Director: Ari Matikainen
 Olette kauniita (2009) Director: Jussi Mäkelä
 Pelastaja (2010) Director: Hannu Aukia
 Ahmat tulevat (2011) Director: Ari Matikainen
 Hiljaa niin kuin kuolleet (2011) Director: Jaani Kivinen
 Sinä & Hän (2013) Director: Ville Juurikkala

References

External links 
 

Finnish musical groups